On the Downlow is the first film by the director Tadeo Garcia, released in 2004. It is a low-budget film starring Michael Cortez and Tony Sancho.

It proved very popular with the film critics and the public, and was released on DVD on January 9, 2007.

Synopsis
On the Downlow is a love story set in Little Village, Chicago, between Angel (Michael Cortez) and Isaac (Tony Sancho), two warm, supportive and sensitive young men. Their affection to each other is shown in a long kiss in a dark alley in Chicago and, later on, in a musical sequence in the film. Isaac also questions his sexuality in a long confession with a priest in the church.

Angel, in order to be with his secret lover Isaac, gives up his allegiance to his former Latin Kings gang and pledges to Isaac's Southside Chicago's Two Six gang led by Reaper (Donato Cruz) after a cruel initiation beating. Although the film uses the names of actual gangs in the area, the introduction to the film says there is no direct relationship to the actual gang names used.

When Reaper is later informed that Angel is an ex-gang member of the rival Latin Kings gang, he decides that Isaac should kill him. Issac desperately tries to arrange for him and Angel to escape Chicago but the inevitable happens and the gang captures Angel. When Isaac refuses to execute Angel, Reaper does it. Isaac then kills Reaper and commits suicide.

Cast
Michael Cortez as Angel
Tony Sancho as Isaac
Donato Cruz as Reaper
Beatriz Jamaica as Angel's Mother
Carmen Cenko as Isaac's Mother
in alphabetical order
Felipe Camacho as Priest (credited as Phil Camacho)
Eric Ambriz as Jimmy
Jimmy Borras Jr. as Niko
Juan Castaneda as Hector
Eddie Cruz as Esau
Jason R. Davis as Store Customer
Jeff Docherty as Dorvak's Partner
Perry Flores as Officer Dorvak
Russell Foster as Man in Yard
Ricardo Garcia as Jesus
Nicolas Gomez as Ozzy
Brian Parenti as Pinto
Adelina Quinones as Laura
Octavio Rivas as Raul
Jonathan Rodriquez as Adam
Pricilla Santiago as Burger Joint Girl
Roberto Soto as Store Owner
Tatiana Suarez-Pico as Mother on Stairs
Andrew Todaro as Mike

Awards
Won "Best Narrative Feature Film" at the New York Newfest Film Festival.

External links
 http://iconoclastfilms.com
Rogers Basement website

2004 films
American LGBT-related films
2004 LGBT-related films
2000s American films